The  of Seibu Railway is a  manually-driven rubber-tyred people mover that runs between  in Higashimurayama, Tokyo and  in Tokorozawa, Saitama in Japan. The line has an official nickname Leo Liner, after 'Leo', the hero of Kimba the White Lion, who is also the mascot of Saitama Seibu Lions baseball team. The line is the only people mover that is operated by one of Japan's major private railway companies.

History
In 1950, the predecessor of the line opened as an attraction ride called , running through the amusement area developed by Seibu Railway and its allies. Battery-powered locomotives were used at the time, running on  gauge track. In 1952, it legally became a train line, with the official name Seibu Yamaguchi Line. In 1984, the steam and battery powered railway closed, The next year, the new people mover line opened, mostly along the same route.

Stations and service
All trains stop at all stations.

References

External links 

 Seibu Railway 

 
Yamaguchi Line
People mover systems in Japan
Railway lines in Tokyo
Rail transport in Saitama Prefecture
Railway lines opened in 1950
1950 establishments in Japan
750 V DC railway electrification